Invitation to Sociology: A Humanistic Perspective is a 1963 book about sociology by the sociologist Peter L. Berger, in which the author sets out the intellectual parameters and calling of the discipline of sociology.

Background 
Berger was a student of social scientist Alfred Schütz, and was influenced by Schütz's approach to sociology.

Summary 
The book sets out to introduce the field of sociology to interested parties, especially potential students, and to highlight key concepts and themes in sociology.

It clarifies both what sociology is, and also what sociology is not (for example - by clearing up confusion with related terms such as social work).

Philosophical and historical reflections recur throughout this short book. For example, Berger addresses the complementary approaches to the study of society developed by Max Weber and Émile Durkheim. Also, which types of questions sociologists may seek to answer (such as the social consequences of religious belief) and those which they cannot address through sociology proper (for example, philosophical questions on the existence of God).

Berger emphasizes that sociology is a broad academic discipline; it is both a body of knowledge and a way of viewing the world, rather than being merely a prescriptive methodology for achieving certain social goals.

As his central theme, Berger advocates that sociology should emphasize its humanistic aspects, rather than adopting the image of positivistic scientism favored by the natural sciences. For example, Berger espouses a focus on historical processes and on the role of persons, their biographies, their concrete social situations, and the moral exercise of their agency, instead of an overly narrow focus on statistical analysis of data in an impersonal fashion.

The content is wide-ranging and engaging for beginners; among other topics, Berger alludes to Machiavellianism, Marxism, psychoanalysis, existentialism, the caste system and race, and Black pride, stating of the latter in 1963, that it is "building up a counter-formation of a black racism that is but a shadow of its white prototype."

The author also ends the book with an appeal to sociologists and students to exercise their moral awareness and a sense of responsibility to use sociology to advance humane causes, human freedom and human dignity.

Influence and reception 
Many of the themes presented in Invitation to Sociology: A Humanistic Perspective were later developed in Berger's 1966 book The Social Construction of Reality, coauthored with Thomas Luckmann. The philosopher Helmut R. Wagner called Invitation to Sociology a "very readable discussion of the field of sociology".

References 

1963 non-fiction books
American non-fiction books
Books by Peter L. Berger
Doubleday (publisher) books
English-language books
Sociology books